Yaadon Ka Idiot Box is an India radio show launched by BIG FM 92.7, narrated by Neelesh Misra. The show is based on dreamlanding stories or imaginary cities in which storyteller use imaginary thoughts to take the listeners to an imaginary world. The show was introduced by Big FM in 2011 and comprises story parts that are known as "seasons". YKIB stories involve listeners in an unreal world where they feel and remember what happened to them. Listeners in India and Pakistan encouraged the storytelling thought of Yaadon Ka Idiot Box, known as "Yaadon Ka Idiot Box With Neelesh Misra".

Reception
Yaadon Ka Idiot Box became popular across both nations and later launched a book series that recounts Misra's imaginary stories. The books are commonly known as "Yaad Sheher". The words "Yaad" and "Sheher" are combinations of Urdu words that mean "The city of memory or recollection".

References

Indian radio programmes
Hindi-language radio programs